The Bergakker inscription is an Elder Futhark inscription discovered on the scabbard of a 5th-century sword. It was found in 1996 in the Dutch town of Bergakker, in the Betuwe, a region once inhabited by the Batavi. There is consensus that the find dates from the period 425-475 and that the inscription is either the singular direct attestation of Frankish (Franconian), or the earliest attestation of Old Dutch (Old Low Franconian).

Inscription 
Runic writing at the time was used along the North Sea coast, in Frisia, but there are very few other extant inscriptions from Francia. The inscription can be read as 

h(a?)þ(V)**s : ann : k(V)sjam :
: log(V)ns :
where V is a non-standard rune, apparently a vowel (variously read as e or u, or as "any vowel"), and * represents an unknown rune. 

Several readings have been presented in literature. There seems to be a consensus that the ann is the past tense of unnan, corresponding to Modern Dutch gunnen, which means "give/bestow/grant". Several authors read the first word as a personal name in the genitive (indicating property), and the last word as meaning "flame, brand", a kenning for swords. The third word is read either as kusjam, meaning "chooser" or "chosen", or as ke(i)sjam meaning "cut" or "cutter", also referring to swords or sword wielders.

Scholarly interpretations

See also
List of runestones

References

Sources
 Bammesberger, Alfred. Die Runeninschrift von Bergakker: Versuch einer Deutung, in: Pforzen und Bergakker. Neue Untersuchungen zu Runeninschriften, edited by Alfred Bammesberger in editorial collaboration with Gaby Waxenberger, Göttingen 1999 (= Historische Sprachforschung (Historical Linguistics): Ergänzungsheft 41, edited by Alfred Bammesberger and Günter Neumann), 180-185.
 Bosman, A.V.A.J, & Looijenga, T. A runic inscription from Bergakker (Gelderland), the Netherlands, in: Amsterdamer Beiträge zur älteren Germanistik, 46, 1996, 9-16.
Grünzweig, Friedrich E. Runeninschriften auf Waffen. Inschriften vom 2. Jahrhundert n. Chr. bis ins Hochmittelalter. Wien 2004 (= Wiener Studien zur Skandinavistik, 11).
 Looijenga, Tineke. The Bergakker Find and its Context, in: Pforzen und Bergakker. Neue Untersuchungen zu Runeninschriften, Göttingen 1999, 141-151. 
  
 Odenstedt, Bengt. The Bergakker Inscription: Transliteration, Interpretation, Message: Some Suggestions, in: Pforzen und Bergakker. Neue Untersuchungen zu Runeninschriften, Göttingen 1999, 163-173. 
Quak, Arend, 'Wieder nach Bergakker', in: Amsterdamer Beiträge zur älteren Germanistik, 53, 2000, 33-39. 
 Seebold, Elmar. Die Runeninschrift von Bergakker, in: Pforzen und Bergakker. Neue Untersuchungen zu Runeninschriften, Göttingen 1999, 157-162. 
 Vennemann, Theo. Note on the Runic Inscription of the Bergakker Scabbard Mount, in: Pforzen und Bergakker. Neue Untersuchungen zu Runeninschriften, Göttingen 1999, 152-156.

External links
 The New Find from Bergakker - An Update from Nytt om runer 
Drawing of the inscription on the metal mount at Gotica.de, Gotisch-Projekte: Projekte zur gotischen Schrift und Literatur by Dr. Christian T. Petersen, M.A. 

Elder Futhark inscriptions
Archaeological discoveries in the Netherlands
1996 archaeological discoveries
Frankish people
History of the Dutch language
Runic inscriptions
Tiel
Old Dutch